"You Still Do" is a song recorded by American country music artist T. G. Sheppard.  It was released in October 1988 as the second single from his album Crossroads. The song peaked at number 14 on the Billboard Hot Country Singles chart.  The song was written by Casey Kelly and Lonnie Wilson.

Chart performance

References

1988 singles
1988 songs
T. G. Sheppard songs
Songs written by Casey Kelly (songwriter)
Songs written by Lonnie Wilson
Columbia Records singles